Boston Bar station is a railway station in Boston Bar, British Columbia, Canada, located at the border of CN's Ashcroft subdivision.

The station is served by Via Rail's The Canadian as a flag stop (48-hour advance notice required). The station is only served by westbound trains towards Vancouver. Eastbound trains call at North Bend railway station along the CPR tracks, on the other side of the Fraser River. This split in service between Vancouver and Ashcroft is due to CN and CPR utilizing directional running through the Thompson- and Fraser Canyon.

References

External links 
Via Rail Station Description

Via Rail stations in British Columbia